Nehru Arts, Science and Commerce College is a college in Hubli, Karnataka, run by Anjuman-e-Islam, the state's oldest minority educational institution. It is affiliated to Karnataka University and was established in 1965.  It is a self-financed co-education college.

Courses offered

Undergraduate
B.A. History, Economics, Kannada
B.A. History, Economics, Political Science
B.A. History, Economics, Sociology
B.Sc. Chemistry, Botany, Zoology
B.Sc. Physics, Chemistry, Mathematics

References

External links
 Location

Universities and colleges in Hubli-Dharwad